Rodrigo Pastorini de León (born 4 March 1990), commonly known as Rodrigo Pastorini, is a Uruguayan footballer who plays as an attacking midfielder or forward for Italian  club Fidelis Andria.

Club career
On 31 January 2023, Pastorini signed with Fidelis Andria in the Italian third-tier Serie C.

International career
Pastorini made his senior début for Uruguay at the 2007 South American Under-17 Football Championship.

Honours

Club
Peñarol
Primera División Uruguaya (1): 2012–13
Copa Libertadores Runner-up (1): 2011
Wanderers
Primera División Uruguaya Runner-up (1): 2013–14

References

External links
 

1990 births
People from Florida Department
Living people
Uruguayan footballers
Uruguay youth international footballers
Association football forwards
Danubio F.C. players
Peñarol players
Racing Club de Montevideo players
Montevideo Wanderers F.C. players
FC Petrolul Ploiești players
Murciélagos FC footballers
Santiago Wanderers footballers
Club Nacional de Football players
Hércules CF players
Sud América players
Academia Deportiva Cantolao players
S.S. Fidelis Andria 1928 players
Uruguayan Primera División players
Liga I players
Ascenso MX players
Chilean Primera División players
Segunda División B players
Peruvian Primera División players
Serie C players
Uruguayan expatriate footballers
Expatriate footballers in Romania
Uruguayan expatriate sportspeople in Romania
Expatriate footballers in Mexico
Uruguayan expatriate sportspeople in Mexico
Expatriate footballers in Chile
Uruguayan expatriate sportspeople in Chile
Expatriate footballers in Spain
Uruguayan expatriate sportspeople in Spain
Expatriate footballers in Peru
Uruguayan expatriate sportspeople in Peru
Expatriate footballers in Italy
Uruguayan expatriate sportspeople in Italy